The Australian island state of Tasmania has a diverse range of geography but a prominent feature is the mountains of the island. 
 
The majority of the mountain peaks of Tasmania are located in the Western half of the state, starting at the coast in the South West and extending inland to the north, or in the Central Highlands.

Tasmania's mountains were part of an ancient range of volcanic peaks from the period of Gondwana, and are the source of a large portion of Tasmania's wealth in the form of mining. Although the eastern half of the state is generally lower and flatter, there are still sizeable peaks located there, such as kunanyi / Mt Wellington.

Notable peaks 

Historical peaks
As late as the mid-1950s adequate surveying of the mountains had not been completed - with the height of 19 peaks described as about in the list in Walch's Tasmanian Almanac of the over 115 peaks mentioned  The lack of sufficient surveying at that time also had the order of the top 10 peaks had:
 Mount Ossa
 Legges Tor
 Barn Bluff
 Mount Pelion West
 Cradle Mountain
 Stack's Bluff
 Mount Gould
 Mount Rufus
 Eldon Peak
 Mount Olympus

When Wilkinson did his 'The Abels' in 1994, items 1-9 were the same as the current list, however Mount Geryon was not in the Abels list, and Mount Gould had not been adequately given height data at that stage.

See also
 Tasmap and links for indication of the mapping of these mountains

Notes

Further reading
 Caine, Nel. (1983) The mountains of northeastern Tasmania: a study of alpine geomorphology Rotterdam: Balkema; Salem, NH, USA. .
 Wilkinson, Bill. (1994)  The Abels: Tasmania’s mountains over 1100 m high Launceston, Tas.: Regal Publications .

External links
  Top 10 peaks
 Peak-Bagger's Guide to Tasmanian Mountains
 A List of Tasmania's High Places (compiled by the Bushwalk-Tasmania forum).

 
Tasmania
Tasmania
Mountains